N-isopropylbenzylamine is a compound that has appeared in chemical literature often playing an intermediary role in applications of experimental synthesis and novel organic transformations. Despite having limited documented uses, it is most well known for having previously come to the attention of the DEA due to being used by illicit methamphetamine manufacturers as a diluent of or substitute for methamphetamine, with many recorded sightings occurring in the years 2007-2008. As of 2018, researchers from the DEA associated with the Methamphetamine Profiling Program, which categorizes route-specific and other impurities in seized drug samples, has stated that isopropylbenzylamine appears only "occasionally". This compound is a chain isomer of methamphetamine that exhibits the same chemical formula and molar mass giving their hydrochloride salts similar physical properties, such as relatively close melting points and comparable appearance. Consequently, it can be used as a substitute or diluent of methamphetamine without this being obvious to users, though the differing melting points and various attributes of its presentation such as softer or more easily broken crystals have been noted as a possible indication of its presence. In Australia it is known to be a border controlled substance. It currently is unknown to be a controlled substance in any other jurisdiction. Isopropylbenzylamine is not thought to have any stimulant effects in its own right, though anecdotal reports suggest that it may be associated with side effects such as headaches and confusion which are not typically associated with methamphetamine itself. The toxicity of N-isopropylbenzylamine has been studied as of 2022 and it has been found to produces toxicity via increasing nitric oxide in vitro. In this study, in vitro toxicity of N-isopropylbenzylamine and its toxicity-related targets were investigated in SN4741, SH-SY5Y or PC12 cell lines that model neurons. The study sounds an alarm for methamphetamine abusers and warns of the dangerousness of N-isopropylbenzylamine for public health. Other "cutting agents" found to have been used for methamphetamine include the related compounds methylbenzylamine and ethylbenzylamine, as well as dimethylsulfone.

References

Drug culture
Illegal drug trade
Methamphetamine
Secondary amines
Isopropylamino compounds
Benzyl compounds